Norton-on-Derwent, commonly referred to as simply Norton, is a town and civil parish in the Ryedale district of North Yorkshire, England. Norton borders the market town of Malton, and is separated from it by the River Derwent. The 2001 Census gave the population of the parish as 6,943, increasing at the 2011 Census to 7,387.

History 
The name Norton is derive from "north farmstead or village", being a settlement to the north of another.

In the Domesday Book Norton is listed three times, as "Nortone" in the Scard wapentake of the East Riding of Yorkshire.

At the foot of the bridge between Norton and Malton in the reign of Henry II was a hospital dedicated to St Nicholas, founded by Roger de Flamvill, and governed by the canons of Malton. In 1823 Norton was in the Wapentake of Buckrose and the East Riding of Yorkshire. Population at the time was 1017. Occupations included five farmers, one of whom was also a lime burner, two blacksmiths, four butchers, six grocers, five shoemakers, three tailors, two horse jockeys, a horse trainer, three raff merchants (dealers in lumber and odd refuse), two schoolmasters, a corn miller, saddler, stonemason, linen draper, cabinet maker, roper, gardener, fellmonger, wheelwright, overseer, and surgeon, and the landlords of The Bay Horse, and The Oak Tree public houses. Resident were fifteen members of the gentry.

Governance
From 1894 to 1974 Norton was an urban district in the East Riding of Yorkshire.

Norton-on-Derwent is in the Thirsk and Malton Parliamentary constituency since its creation for the 2010 general election, and before this it was in the Ryedale constituency.

There are now two electoral wards in Norton  (east and west). Their cumulative population is identical to that of the town.

Community

Norton, with Malton, has significance within the horse racing industry for the town's many stables.

There is a 27-hole golf course located off Welham Road, (Malton & Norton Golf Club) which covers a large part of the south-west end of the town. The club is the 'home club' of European Tour professional Simon Dyson.

Norton's schools are Norton Primary School, and Norton College secondary school. The secondary school has Academy and specialist Technology College status, a sixth form college and a playgroup.

Sport facilities include a swimming pool, a skate park, and Norton College sixth form gym that is open to the public.

Malton Bacon Factory in Norton is a major employer for both Norton, Malton and the local area.

Transport
Because of the town's close proximity to Malton, Norton has access to the A64, which runs from Leeds and York to Scarborough, and the A169 to Pickering and Whitby.

Both Malton bus station and Malton railway station are located in Norton.

Norton is home to Coastliner, a division of the Transdev bus group. Buses run from Leeds and York through Norton and Malton to Pickering, Whitby, Scarborough, Filey and Bridlington. There are also regular buses to Castle Howard and Hovingham, and other local bus routes.

Malton railway station is on the TransPennine Express route, with fast trains every hour running from Scarborough to York, Leeds, Manchester and Liverpool. There are long term plans to re-open the rail link between Malton and Pickering, which would create a new service from Malton to Whitby. A preliminary feasibility study was published in July 2000, indicating that re-opening this section was technically possible.

Skatepark 

Norton skatepark is situated on Norton Road and is made up of wooden ramps (Skatelite) on a tarmac base. The skatepark features a back and forth run with a quarter pipe and flat bank either side of a pyramidal funbox, as well as a mini ramp, grind rail and grind box. It also has a Halfpipe (Vert Ramp) which has now become world famous. It is now one of only ten in the country and is the only free to use outdoor vert ramp in the north of England. Ryan Swain (presenter) has been spearheading a global campaign called #rescuetheramp appealing to the towns councils to restore it. Swain also got world famous skateboarder Tony Hawk to support his campaign. The park has newly been refurbished and restored by King Ramps, Swain assisted in the build. The Halfpipe ramp, which opened 21 years ago, is thought to be the country's last free to use ones. It is the only one in the north and just one of 10 in the country which is free to use. A blue plaque has also been put in place at a newly repaired skate park in honor of a "much loved" BMX rider from the area named Tom Warrington.

Arms

References

 
Towns in North Yorkshire
Civil parishes in North Yorkshire
Ryedale